Delhi Public School, Kidwai Nagar, Kanpur is a private school running under the aegis of Delhi Public School Society, New Delhi. It is a primary school, having classes from Play Group to Class V. It serves as the junior wing of DPS Barra, Kanpur.

Overview 
Delhi Public School was established in Kidwai Nagar in the year 2011. It functions under the supervision and guidance of its Head Mistress, Mrs. Alka Joshi. Moreover, DPS Barra (under the aegis of Delhi Public School Society, New Delhi and affiliated to CBSE, New Delhi) was established in the year 2011 as the senior and full-fledged wing of DPS Kidwai Nagar.

DPS Kidwai Nagar is a co-educational day school with more than 200 students. The school provides air-conditioned classrooms for its Pre-Primary classes. DPS Kidwai Nagar's infrastructure consists of: a swimming pool, a discovery room, a mini-zoo, a computer lab and a playground. For non-formal education, the school conducts classes for music, dance, art, theatrics, public speaking etc.

Activities 
Umang - Annual Concert 2014
Umang is the annual concert organized by DPS Kidwai Nagar & DPS Barra. It is a platform for the students to present social awareness and understanding of diverse cultures & religion through music and dance.

Our Shining Stars - Annual Award Ceremony
DPS Kidwai Nagar concluded its academic session 2013-14 with an Award Ceremony, "Our Shining Stars", in its premises on 24 March. A ceremony is organized each year to acknowledge, build confidence and to motivate the young achievers by presenting the deserving students with awards for their hard work and dedication shown during the year.

See also 
 Delhi Public School Society
 List of schools in Kanpur
 Delhi Public School, Azaad Nagar
 DPS Barra
 Delhi Public School, Servodaya Nagar

References

External links 
 
 DPS Family Official Website

Primary schools in Uttar Pradesh
Delhi Public School Society
Schools in Kanpur
Educational institutions established in 2011
2011 establishments in Delhi